Schmetterlinge im Bauch is a German television series.

See also
List of German television series

External links

2006 telenovelas
German telenovelas
2006 German television series debuts
2007 German television series endings
German-language television shows
Sat.1 telenovelas